Cameron Thor (born March 17, 1960) is a former American actor, filmmaker and acting coach. He is best known for his appearances in the films Jurassic Park and Hook. In 2016, he was sentenced to six years in prison for sexually assaulting a 13-year-old girl.

Career
Thor began his career in 1984, he appeared in the 1991 films Hook and Curly Sue. He is best known for playing Lewis Dodgson in the 1993 film Jurassic Park. Thor had originally auditioned for the role of Ian Malcolm. While his character was a major part of the sequel novel, The Lost World, the character was left out of the film adaptation. He then worked as an acting coach in Los Angeles. He and his wife Alice Carter co-own Carter Thor Studio.

Legal issues
On June 4, 2014, Thor was charged with the 2009 sexual assault of a 13-year-old girl by the Los Angeles County Sheriff's office. The Los Angeles District Attorney's office initially filed 14 counts against Thor, including kidnapping and sexual assault against a minor. Thor pleaded not guilty to all counts.

Thor's trial began on August 17, 2015, by which time 13 of the charges against him had been dropped. The only remaining charge was performing a lewd act on a child. The jury began deliberations on August 25, returning a guilty verdict the following day. After several delays, including Thor appointing a new defense attorney,  he was eventually sentenced to six years in state prison on April 27, 2016. He was released from prison in June 2019.

Filmography

Film

Television

References

External links

1960 births
Living people
20th-century American male actors
21st-century American criminals
21st-century American male actors
American acting coaches
American male criminals
American male film actors
American male television actors
American people convicted of child sexual abuse
Criminals from Los Angeles
Male actors from Los Angeles
Prisoners and detainees of California